No Reservations is the first album by the American Southern rock band Blackfoot, released in 1975.

Track listing 
All songs by Jakson Spires, except "Railroad Man" by Shorty Medlocke

 "Railroad Man" – 2:22
 "Indian World" – 2:52
 "Stars" – 4:08
 "Not Another Maker" – 5:08
 "Born to Rock & Roll" – 3:37
 "Take a Train" – 4:23
 "Big Wheels" – 5:05
 "I Stand Alone" – 7:47
 "Railroad Man" – 1:10
 "Hunting for Yourself" – 3:44 (Bonus Track)
 "Bummed Out" – 3:06 (Bonus Track)

Personnel

Band members 
 Rickey Medlocke – lead vocals, rhythm, lead and acoustic guitars, dobro
 Charlie Hargrett – lead, rhythm and acoustic guitars
 Greg T. Walker – bass guitar, backing vocals, keyboards
 Jakson Spires – drums, backing vocals, percussion

Production 
 Jimmy Johnson and David Hood – producers
 George Marino – mastering engineer

References

External links 
 Blackfoot - No Reservations (1975) album review by James Chrispell, credits & releases at AllMusic.com
 Blackfoot - No Reservations (1975) album releases & credits at Discogs.com

1975 debut albums
Blackfoot (band) albums
Albums recorded at Muscle Shoals Sound Studio